Joseph Herbert Buxton (20 November 1912 – 10 February 1992) was an English cricketer.  Buxton was a right-handed batsman who bowled right-arm fast-medium.  He was born at Kirkby-in-Ashfield, Nottinghamshire.

Buxton made a single first-class appearance for Nottinghamshire against Gloucestershire at Trent Bridge in the 1937 County Championship.  Batting first, Nottinghamshire made 396 all out, with Buxton the last man out when he was dismissed by Reg Sinfield for 6 runs.  In response, Gloucestershire were dismissed for 350, with Buxton taking the wicket of Charlie Barnett to finish with figures of 1/54 from eighteen overs.  Nottinghamshire declared their second-innings on 204/4, with Buxton not required to bat.  Gloucestershire reached 107/2 in their second-innings, in which Buxton bowled eleven wicketless overs.  The match ended in a draw.  This was his only major appearance for the county.

He died at Mansfield, Nottinghamshire, on 10 February 1992.  His uncle, Noah Buxton, was also a first-class cricketer.

References

External links
Joseph Buxton at ESPNcricinfo
Joseph Buxton at CricketArchive

1912 births
1992 deaths
People from Kirkby-in-Ashfield
Cricketers from Nottinghamshire
English cricketers
Nottinghamshire cricketers